The 1973–74 NCAA Division I men's basketball rankings was made up of two human polls, the AP Poll and the Coaches Poll, in addition to various other preseason polls.

Legend

AP Poll 
The January 21, 1974 poll was the first where UCLA was not ranked #1 since the rankings on February 1, 1971 – a string of 46 consecutive AP polls that stretched across parts of four seasons. The Bruins would regain the top ranking for three more weeks before NC State would grab the top spot for the final six weeks.

UPI Poll

References 

1978-79 NCAA Division I men's basketball rankings
College men's basketball rankings in the United States